Carbon Trade Watch is an independent research collective working on climate change and climate policy from a justice-based perspective. It was formerly part of the Amsterdam-based Transnational Institute. Since January 2010, Carbon Trade Watch is an autonomous legal association based in Barcelona, Spain. The ‘new’ organisation, Environmental Justice Research Collective (EJRC), houses the same team and the ongoing work of Carbon Trade Watch as well as expand into new research areas.

By centring its work on bottom-up community-led projects and campaigns, Carbon Trade Watch aims to provide a durable body of research which ensures that a holistic and justice-based analysis of climate change and environmental policies is not forgotten or compromised. As part of their solidarity work, CTW aims to accompany and support movements and communities in their local initiatives and struggles for environmental and social justice. Importantly, the collective gathers and translates work with others in this field to help facilitate broader co-operation and understanding.

Their work includes the film The Carbon Connection and the book Carbon Trading: How it works and why it fails.

Cases
Carbon Trade Watch has worked on a number of significant cases that helped render public issues of emissions trading. These cases have also led to a number of academic studies, engaging with these cases in more detail.

 Bisasar Road Landfill methane recovery and gas to electricity Clean Development Mechanism and proposed Prototype Carbon Fund project. Studying this case pointed to the intersection of health concerns, waster generation and partial stakeholder participation possibilities.

References

External links 

 Official website

Climate change organizations
Climate change policy
Green politics
Greenwashing
International sustainability organizations
Radical environmentalism